The 2018 Kurume U.S.E Cup was a professional tennis tournament played on outdoor carpet courts. It was the fourteenth edition of the tournament and was part of the 2018 ITF Women's Circuit. It took place in Kurume, Japan, on 14–20 May 2018.

Singles main draw entrants

Seeds 

 1 Rankings as of 7 May 2018.

Other entrants 
The following players received a wildcard into the singles main draw:
  Robu Kajitani
  Kanako Morisaki
  Suzuho Oshino

The following players received entry from the qualifying draw:
  Sakura Hondo
  Ari Matsumoto
  Abbie Myers
  Anastasia Nefedova

Champions

Singles

 Ayano Shimizu def.  Abbie Myers, 6–3, 7–5

Doubles
 
 Naomi Broady /  Asia Muhammad def.  Katy Dunne /  Abigail Tere-Apisah, 6–2, 6–4

External links 
 Official website
 2018 Kurume U.S.E Cup at ITFtennis.com

2018 ITF Women's Circuit
2018 in Japanese tennis
Kurume Best Amenity Cup